Khaliq Mehtab bin Mohd Ishaq is a Malaysian politician who has served as Member of the Penang State Legislative Assembly (MLA) for Bertam from May 2018 until March 2023 and Chairman of Penang Regional Development Authority since May 2020. He is a member of the Malaysian United Indigenous Party (BERSATU), a component party of presently the state opposition but federal ruling Perikatan Nasional (PN) and formerly state ruling but federal opposition Pakatan Harapan (PH) coalition.

Personal life 
He is the younger brother of Azlina Mehtab, former Women's Chief of UMNO in Penang. His mother is a Chinese and he communicates with his mother using Hokkien since he was young, although he cannot speak Mandarin Chinese.

Career 
He is a lawyer in Messrs. Azlina Mehtab & Associates.

He was appointed as the Chairman of Penang Regional Development Authority in 21 May 2020 to replace Mohamed Haniff Khatri Abdulla.

Politics 
He joined BERSATU in September 2016. He competed for Bertam in 2018 Malaysian general election and won the seat.

Election results

References

External links 

Malaysian Muslims
Living people
Members of the Penang State Legislative Assembly
Malaysian United Indigenous Party politicians
1976 births